Arey (Russian: "АРЭЙ") is a Russian security and surveillance equipment supplier  based in Krasnoyarsk, Krasnoyarsk Krai. At one time was an aircraft manufacturer. In the mid-2000s the company specialized in the design and manufacture of paramotors in the form of ready-to-fly aircraft for the US FAR 103 Ultralight Vehicles rules and the European microlight category, as well as aircraft engines.

After ceasing production of aircraft, the company carried on as a supplier of security and surveillance equipment. The company seems to have been founded about 2002, but by 2015 the company website was non-functional and so it is not clear if the company is still in business or not.

The company designed and produced its own paramotor engine, the  Arey A-170 and then designed a paramotor to use the engine, the Arey Tatush T120M. The company also sold the Tatush with the Hirth F33 and Solo 210 engines as options.

A powered parachute design, the Arey Telezhka, was also developed in the form of a lightweight wheel set to be combined with the Tatush.

Aircraft

References

External links

Company website archives on Archive.org

Defunct aircraft manufacturers of Russia
Ultralight aircraft
Paramotors
Companies based in Krasnoyarsk